Polymelus (1902–1924) was a British Thoroughbred racehorse who was the leading sire of racehorses in Great Britain and Ireland for five years (1914, 1915, 1916, 1920, 1921). Among his most famous descendants are Secretariat and Northern Dancer. However, it was through his son Phalaris that he will forever be remembered. His great grandsire was Bend Or.

Background
Polymelus was a bay horse bred by Lord Crewe. He was sired by Cyllene, an Ascot Gold Cup winner, who went on to become a highly successful stallion. In addition to Polymelus, he sired The Derby winners Cicero, Minoru, Tagalie and Lemberg and was champion sire in 1909 and 1910.

Polymelus's dam Maid Marian was a half-sister to the outstanding racemare La Fleche and later became an influential broodmare in her own right, being the foundation mare of Thoroughbred family 3-f. Her other descendants have included Big Red Mike, Mioland, Mont Tremblant, Pont l'Eveque, Right Royal and Saint Estephe.

Racing career
Poymelus showed great promise as a two-year-old, winning both the Criterion Stakes and the Richmond Stakes.

As a three-year-old in 1905 he showed form over a wide variety of distances, winning the Duke of York Stakes over six furlong and finishing second in the St Leger.

In 1906 Polymelus was offered for sale at Newmarket and bought for 4,200 Guineas by Solomon Joel. The colt reached his peak later that year when he recorded victories in the Duke of York Handicap, Cambridgeshire Handicap and Champion Stakes. He added a win in the Princess of Wales's Stakes in 1907 before being retired to stud.

Stud record
Polymelus stood at stud at Solomon Joel's Maiden Erlegh Stud near Reading, Berkshire where he died in 1924. Among his progeny, Polymelus sired:

The skeleton of Polymelus is now on display in the entrance lobby of the University of Cambridge Museum of Zoology, where it is an example of the specialised adaptations to high-speed running.

Pedigree

References
 Details on page 44 in Designing Speed in the Racehorse by Ken McLean (2005) 

1902 racehorse births
1924 racehorse deaths
Racehorses bred in the United Kingdom
Racehorses trained in the United Kingdom
British Champion Thoroughbred Sires
Horse monuments
Thoroughbred family 3-f